Palazzani is an Italian surname. Notable people with the surname include:

 Dario Palazzani (born 1954), Italian sports shooter
 Guglielmo Palazzani (born 1991), Italian rugby union player

Italian-language surnames